('How beautifully the morning star shines'),  1, is a church cantata for Annunciation by Johann Sebastian Bach. In 1725, when the cantata was composed, the feast of the Annunciation (25 March) coincided with Palm Sunday. Based on Philipp Nicolai's hymn "" (1599), it is one of Bach's chorale cantatas. Bach composed it in his second year as Thomaskantor (cantor at St. Thomas) in Leipzig, where the Marian feast was the only occasion during Lent when music of this kind was permitted. The theme of the hymn suits both the Annunciation and Palm Sunday occasions, in a spirit of longing expectation of an arrival. As usual for Bach's chorale cantata cycle, the hymn was paraphrased by a contemporary poet who retained the hymn's first and last stanzas unchanged, but transformed the themes of the inner stanzas into a sequence of alternating recitatives and arias.

 is the last chorale cantata of Bach's second cantata cycle, possibly because the librettist who provided the paraphrases for the middle movements of these cantatas was no longer available. Bach scored the work for three vocal soloists, a four-part choir and a Baroque instrumental ensemble of two horns, two oboes da caccia, two solo violins, strings and continuo. The chorale melody of Nicolai's hymn appears in the opening and closing choral movements of the cantata. All instruments play in the opening festive chorale fantasia, in which the soprano sings the hymn tune, and the two solo concertante violins represent the morning star. An oboe da caccia accompanies the vocal soloist in the first aria. The strings, including the solo violins, return in the second aria. An independent horn part crowns the closing chorale.

The original performance parts of the cantata, partly written by the composer, are conserved in Leipzig. Commentators writing about the cantata, such as Carl von Winterfeld in the 19th century and W. Gillies Whittaker in the 20th century, were particularly impressed by its opening chorus. The Bach-Gesellschaft published the cantata in 1851 as first work in the first volume of their complete edition of Bach's works.

Background 
In 1723, Bach was appointed as Thomaskantor and director musices in Leipzig, which made him responsible for the music at four churches. He provided church music for the two main churches, St. Thomas and St. Nicholas, and occasionally also for two others, the New Church and St. Peter. Bach took office in the middle of the liturgical year, on the first Sunday after Trinity.

In Leipzig, cantata music was expected on Sundays and on feast days, except during the tempus clausum ("silent periods") of Advent and Lent. Lutheran Leipzig observed several Marian feasts, including Annunciation on 25 March, nine months before Christmas. In 1725, the feast fell on Palm Sunday. Annunciation was the only occasion for festive music during Lent. The prescribed readings were, as the epistle, Isaiah's prophecy of the birth of the Messiah (Isaiah 7:10–16), and from the Gospel of Luke, the angel Gabriel announcing the birth of Jesus (Luke 1:26–38).

Cantata cycles 

In his first twelve months in office, Bach decided to compose new works for almost all liturgical occasions. These works became known as his first cantata cycle. In his second year in office, Bach composed a cycle of chorale cantatas, with each cantata based on one Lutheran hymn, for the liturgical occasions. The choice of hymn for each of the cantatas was probably made according to the wishes of a local minister, who based the choices upon the prescribed readings and his plans for sermons. Compared to the first cycle, the music has less emphasis on biblical texts, but more on the use of chorale text and melody.

Bach's earliest extant chorale cantata, written more than a decade before arriving in Leipzig, followed the  principle, that is, it adopted the text of all stanzas of the hymn without modification, the hymn's melody being used throughout. Most of the chorale cantatas Bach wrote in his second year in Leipzig, including , were formatted differently. In this structure, the outer stanzas of the hymn, and its melody, were retained in the outer movements of the cantata: typically the first stanza was set as an opening chorale fantasia, and the last as a closing four-part chorale. The inner stanzas of the hymn were rephrased into recitatives and arias for the cantata's inner movements, their setting mostly not based on the hymn tune.

Hymn 

Bach's cantata  is based on Philipp Nicolai's hymn with the same name. Nicolai wrote the hymn when he was pastor in Unna and faced an outbreak of the plague, intending it to project a view of a heavenly world as counterpoint to pain and suffering in the real world. Nicolai published the hymn in 1599 as part of a collection titled  ('Mirror of the joys of eternal life') in 1599. The hymn tune with which Nicolai published his text, Zahn No. 8359, is reminiscent of a 1538 melody published in the Strasbourg Psalter in 1539 with the song , possibly by Jakob Dachser, Zahn No. 1705.

The image of the morning star is taken from Revelation 22:16 ("I am the root and the offspring of David, and the bright and morning star."). Nicolai did not write a paraphrase of the biblical texts, but used elements from them for the seven stanzas of his hymn. He also alludes to the nativity.

The hymn was associated with Epiphany but also with the Annunciation. Expressing the longing for the arrival of the Saviour, it can be connected to the reading about Jesus' birth being announced to Mary. The theme of arrival was also fitting for Palm Sunday, when the arrival of Jesus in Jerusalem is celebrated.

Libretto and first performance 

A librettist retained the first and last stanzas of the hymn and paraphrased the other stanzas, using the second stanza for the first recitative, the third stanza for the first aria, the fourth stanza and part of the fifth for the second recitative, and the sixth stanza for the second aria. Bach scholar Alfred Dürr wrote: "The librettist must be credited with the empathy he shows for that fervour which characterises Nicolai's poem and which has made his hymns into an enduring possession of the Protestant Church." While the identity of the librettist, a "poetically and theologically competent specialist", is not certain, scholars have suggested Andreas Stübel, a Leipzig intellectual who held controversial theological views.

For the first performance of the cantata, on 25 March 1725, Bach helped copy out his composition score for the musicians participating in the premiere. Johann Andreas Kuhnau, a main copyist of Bach at the time, produced most of this performance material, that is, all performance parts, except the figured bass part (partly written by the composer) and one of the oboe da caccia parts (written by the composer's son Wilhelm Friedemann).

 was to be the last newly-composed chorale cantata of Bach's second cantata cycle. If Stübel was the librettist, his death in January 1725 would explain the end of the chorale cantatas in the second cycle, because Bach lost a competent collaborator and source of inspiration. Bach returned to other texts for the remaining liturgical times of Easter, Pentecost and Trinity. The completion of the cycle of chorale cantatas was so important to him that he included the early chorale cantata for Easter, in 1725, and over the following decade added a few chorale cantatas for some missing occasions.

Music 
The title page of the extant 18th-century set of performance parts of BWV 1, written around 1750 by an unknown scribe, mentions the occasion (Annunciation), the cantata's title (incipit) and scoring, and its composer.

Scoring and structure 
Bach structured the cantata in six movements. Both text and tune of the hymn are retained in the outer choral movements, a chorale fantasia and a four-part closing chorale, which frame a sequence of alternating recitatives and arias. Bach scored the work for three vocal soloists (soprano (S), tenor (T) and bass (B)), a four-part choir, and a Baroque instrumental ensemble of two horns (Co), two oboes da caccia (Oc), two solo violins (Vs), strings consisting of two violin parts (Vl) and one viola part (Va), and basso continuo. A festive scoring like this, including brass, was usually employed on holidays. The duration of the cantata is given as 25 minutes.

In the following table of the movements, the scoring, keys and time signatures are taken from Dürr. The continuo, which plays throughout, is not shown.

Movements 
Bach provided a rich orchestration. The sparkle of the morning star is illustrated by two solo violins, first in the first chorus, and reappearing with the other strings in the second aria. The sound of the oboe da caccia, first heard in the opening chorus, returns in the first aria. In the closing chorale, the four-part harmony setting of the hymn tune, performed by choir and colla parte instruments, is complemented by a counter-melody played by the second horn. Bach would later use the pair of horns in Part IV of his Christmas Oratorio, dealing with the naming of Jesus as announced to Mary.

1 

The first movement, "" ('How beautifully the morning star shines'), is a stately, richly coloured chorale fantasia for the chorus. The  of the chorale melody is sung in long notes of dotted minims by the sopranos. A substantial orchestral 12-bar ritornello or sinfonia begins the movement, with the solo instruments in the foreground; its wide harmonic range contrasts with the chorale, which remains mostly in the tonic key of F major. Bach achieves "unusual animation" by setting the hymn not in common time but . The scintillating semiquaver passagework of two solo concertante violins illustrate the sparkle of the morning star. A baroque pastoral imagery is established by the addition of two other pairs of solo instruments which play pronouncedly below the range of the higher solo violin bariolage, resulting in a transparent multilayered musical texture: the two pairs of horns and oboes da caccia, all associated with the hunt and nature, evoking a bucolic landscape.

The text of the hymn is reflected in the music iconography: the horn calls signify the majesty of the king, while the virtuosic concertante violin passagework signifies the morning star and joy in the universe. Musical analysis of the chorale fantasia makes specific references to the 10 lines of the hymn text; an English metrical translation is given here as an ad hoc composite, combining two early 18th-century sources, the Lyra Davidica and the Psalmodia Germanica, as well as a late 19th-century translation by M. Woolsey Stryker.

The 12-bar sinfonia is based on themes that are derived directly from the cantus firmus (notated here in the soprano clef); in particular the leap of a fifth in the opening theme and the recurring triads. Thus, as conductor John Eliot Gardiner notes, the movement begins intimately with a phrase of the second solo violin, with an orchestral tutti as response. The phrase is reprised a fifth higher by the first solo violin, again answered by the full orchestra. An inversion of the last three quavers in the first theme provides a second theme, which is heard amongst the three different solo instrumental groups—horns, oboes da caccia and violins—and is echoed individually, before an orchestral tutti on a cadence, heralding the entrance of the soprano. The sinfonia is similar in structure to a concerto grosso where different pairs of solo instruments compete against each other.

After the sinfonia, the first line of the soprano cantus firmus is countered by the lower voices with a version of the first theme, doubled by instruments. Throughout the fantasia, whenever the cantus firmus is exposed, it is doubled by the horn. The other nine lines are punctuated by instrumental episodes of differing lengths. Some are quite short, where other pairs of instruments briefly play the first theme. For line 2, the tenor, followed by the alto, sing the cantus firmus in diminution, i.e. sung at twice the speed, with dotted crotchets instead of minims. Line 5 is similar, but this time the alto is followed by the tenor. In the episode between lines 2 and 3, the second themes are heard. Between lines 3 and 4 there is a recurrence of the sinfonia with different solo instruments allocated to the parts. Between lines 4 and 5, there is a two bar episode with the first theme; and between lines 5 and 6, the second theme is heard again. The vocal lines 4–6 are a repetition of lines 1–3, reflecting the over-arching bar form of the movement.

The extended instrumental passage between lines 6 and 7 features a duet between the two concertante violins, with the first theme countering the semiquaver bariolage. In line 7 the word "" ('lovely') is sung to plain chords in the choir, punctuated by one bar of the first theme; in line 8 the same happens for the word "" ('kindly'). After a two-bar episode similar to the violin duet, the whole orchestra and chorus are heard in line 9, with rolling quavers, in contrary motion. A 4-bar episode for the concertante violins leads to fugal entries in the lower voices and the climactic tenth line: with animated accompaniment from the entire orchestra and lower voices, the sopranos sing a descending scale to the words "" ('high and most sublime in splendour'). The orchestral ritornello closes the movement.

Dürr and Richard Jones write that the chorale fantasia is "a movement of jubilant splendour, colourful profusion, and Advent joy". W. Gillies Whittaker describes the long movement as "one of the most unforgettable pictures in musical art" with "kaleidoscopic changes of the fascinating material".

2 
The tenor expresses in secco recitative the belief "" ('You, very son of God and Mary'). The text is crafted paraphrasing the second stanza of the hymn, and also alludes to the annunciation from the Gospel reading.

3 

In the first aria, the soprano renders "" ('Fill utterly, you divine celestial flames'), accompanied by an obbligato oboe da caccia, an instrument in alto range. The instruments illustrate the celestial flames in coloraturas. Two oboe parts exist for the obbligato instrument, one in the normal clef for an oboe da caccia, the other in a "fingering notation". Ulrich Leisinger, editor of a publication by Carus, noted that it is unclear if the latter was meant to help a player not experienced in the instrument, or if actually two players alternated, which would make breathing easier.

4 
In another secco recitative, "" ('No earthly gloss, no fleshly light could ever stir my soul'), the bass contrasts earthly light with heavenly light. The terms "" ('joyful radiance') and "" ('refreshment') are emphasised by a melisma. Editor Leisinger summarised: "Nothing worldly pleases the soul, only that semblance of joy which is sent by God alone (for which the morning star can evidently serve as an image)".

5 

The text of the fifth movement, "" ('Our mouths and the tones of strings'), paraphrases the stanza  ('Pluck the strings of the cittern'). The aria is sung by the tenor who, following the text, is accompanied by strings only, including the two solo violins from the first movement. An expression of thanks and praise, it is intensified by a dance-like motion, described as "graceful minuet pulse" by Bach scholar Klaus Hofmann. The soloist sings coloraturas on the repeated word  ('singing').

6 

The closing chorale, "" ('How heartily glad I am indeed'), is complemented by an independent part of the second horn, while the other instruments play colla parte with the four-part chorale sung by the choir. Thus, the last chorale cantata in the second cantata cycle reaches an "air of baroque festive splendour".

Reception 

Bundles of original performance parts of the chorale cantatas, including , were briefly owned by the composer's widow, Anna Magdalena, who sold them to the St. Thomas School. Apart from Bach's motets, these chorale cantatas were the only works of the composer which were performed with some continuity in Leipzig between the composer's death and the 19th-century Bach Revival. Over a century later, the St. Thomas School deposited the original performance part manuscripts of the chorale cantata cycle in the Bach Archive in Leipzig, for conservation.

Carl von Winterfeld's description of the cantata, published in 1847, focuses mostly on the composition's opening movement. Writing in the second half of the 19th century, Philipp Spitta listed 35 Bach chorale cantatas in alphabetical order in the second volume of his biography Johann Sebastian Bach, but assumed that all these works were composed late in Bach's career. He wrote: "In these thirty-five cantatas a series of the most beautiful and the best known Protestant chorales of the sixteenth and seventeenth centuries is subjected to elaborate treatment." Building on Spitta's educated guesswork about the time of origin of Bach's church cantatas—which was later proven to be largely mistaken—Reginald Lane Poole listed the cantata as the last one composed by Bach, thus ranging it as a very mature work.

In the 1906 , the third yearbook of the Neue Bachgesellschaft, Woldemar Voigt wrote about the cantata:

Albert Schweitzer, in his book J. S. Bach, published in 1908 and translated in 1911, still dated the chorale cantatas to 1734 and later. Schweitzer wrote in a short passage about the first movement of  that Bach's "music converts the text into an expression of mystical exuberance. In the orchestral accompaniment the themes of the separate hues of the chorale are largely employed as motives."

Dürr's comprehensive study of the chronology of Bach's cantatas was first published in the late 1950s: in it, the cantata's time of origin was fixed to Bach's second year in Leipzig. In preparation of the 2018 Bachfest Leipzig, three Bach experts were asked to name their favourites among Bach's cantatas: Gardiner, Michael Maul (then the festival's new director), and Peter Wollny, the director of the Bach Archive. 15 cantatas appeared in the lists of all three, including .

Publication 

The Bach-Gesellschaft chose  as first composition in the first volume of the Bach-Gesellschaft Ausgabe (BGA). Its first volume was published in 1851, edited by Hauptmann. Leisinger mentioned three reasons why the 's choice to open their edition with this cantata made sense:
 The text of the cantata consisted of words and thoughtful paraphrases of a traditional chorale, countering mid-19th-century views that "wretched" late Baroque lyrics were an obstacle for reviving Bach's vocal music.
 The cantata's designation for a Marian feast could make it attractive for a Catholic audience too, thus helping to establish the nation-wide importance of the BGA edition.
 Choosing a particularly well-crafted and mature composition, like this cantata, would add to the prestige of its composer, confirming the perception he had composed nothing but masterpieces.

 prepared a vocal score for a publication by Edition Peters in Leipzig in 1875. Breitkopf & Härtel, the publisher of the BGA, began a series of vocal scores of Bach's cantatas, titled , with this cantata appearing around 1890. They published another version in the same series around 1932, with an English text by Mevanwy Roberts, All glorious doth the day-star shine, a French text by Henriette Fuchs, and a piano reduction by Günter Raphael. Possibly in 1928, a score of the cantata was published in the series  by Eulenburg in Leipzig; Arnold Schering had revised the BGA, based on the original vocal parts.

An English version was published in London as a vocal score, as part of Novello's Original Octavo Edition, possibly in 1927. The translation, titled How Brightly Shines yon Star of Morn was made by Paul England, and the piano reduction prepared by John E. West. In the U.S., a vocal score appeared in Philadelphia around 1947, titled How Bright and Fair the Morning Star, as No. 88 of the Choral Series of the Association of American Choruses. The New Bach Edition (NBA) published the work in 1995, edited by Matthias Wendt, with critical commentary added the same year. Carus published a critical edition in German and English as part of its  in 1998, edited by Reinhold Kubik. In the 21st century, Bach Digital published high-resolution facsimile images of the manuscript parts from the first quarter of the 18th century.

Recordings 

The conductor Fritz Lehmann recorded Bach's cantatas with the Berliner Motettenchor and the Berliner Philharmoniker with Deutsche Grammophon in the early 1950s. The recordings of nine cantatas, including , were reissued in 2018. Fritz Werner recorded around 50 of Bach's church cantatas with the Heinrich-Schütz-Chor Heilbronn and the Pforzheim Chamber Orchestra, mostly in the 1960s, including .

In 1971,  was the first cantata recorded for the Teldec series—a project aiming to record all church cantatas by Bach on period instruments in historically informed performances, conducted by Nikolaus Harnoncourt and Gustav Leonhardt. All vocalists were male singers, as during Bach's tenure in Leipzig. Helmuth Rilling, who began a recording of all Bach cantatas in 1969 and completed it in 1985, recorded  in 1980, with the Gächinger Kantorei and Bach-Collegium Stuttgart.

Pieter Jan Leusink conducted all Bach church cantatas with the Holland Boys Choir and the Netherlands Bach Collegium in historically informed performance, but with women for the solo soprano parts. Gardiner, who in 2000 conducted the Bach Cantata Pilgrimage with the Monteverdi Choir, performing and recording Bach's church cantatas on the occasion for which they written, recorded  at St Peter's Church, Walpole St Peter. Masaaki Suzuki, who studied historically informed practice in Europe, began recording Bach's church cantatas with the Bach Collegium Japan in 1999, at first not aiming at a complete cycle, but completing all in 2017. They released  in 2007.

References

Cited sources 
By title
 
 
 
 

By author

Further reading

External links 

 
 Wie schön leuchtet der Morgenstern: BWV 001 on the website of the J. S. Bach Foundation (includes video).

Church cantatas by Johann Sebastian Bach
Chorale cantatas
1725 compositions
Compositions in F major
Annunciation in Christian art